Phil Moriarty (April 12, 1914 – August 18, 2012) was a swimming and diving coach from the United States. He notably coached at Yale University for 37 years, from 1939-1976. He also served as a diving coach for the USA team to the 1960 Summer Olympics.

While at Yale, Moriarty served as an assistant coach to Robert Kiphuth up-to Kiphuth's retirement in 1959, at which point Moriarty replaced Kiphuth as Yale's head coach. Among the athletes he coached were swimmers Don Schollander, Mike Austin, Steve Clark, John Nelson and Jeff Farrell; and divers Bob Clotworthy and David Browning.

Among the honors he received, Moriarty was inducted into the International Swimming Hall of Fame in 1980, and was inducted in the American Swimming Coaches Association's hall of fame in 2009. He was named the NCAA's Swimming Coach of the Year in 1971.

See also
 List of members of the International Swimming Hall of Fame

References

American swimming coaches
Yale Bulldogs swimming coaches
2012 deaths
1914 births
Yale Bulldogs diving coaches